André Filipe Sousa Dias Pedro Lopes (born 2 November 2001), known as just André Lopes, is a Portuguese professional footballer who plays as a left-back for Mafra .

Club career 
On the 27 November 2021, as a COVID-hit Belenenses were forced to name a team of just nine players for the Primeira Liga home game against Benfica, João Monteiro made his professional debut, starting the game as a left-back. The encounter led to a 7–0 lead for Benfica at half time, before the game was eventually stopped during the break, as João Monteiro was injured.

On 1 August 2022, Lopes signed with Mafra, where he was assigned to the Under-23 squad. He was first called up to Mafra's senior squad for the game against Nacional on 13 February 2023.

Personal life
Lopes is the son of the retired Portuguese football goalkeeper Paulo Lopes.

References

External links

2001 births
Living people
Portuguese footballers
Association football defenders
Belenenses SAD players
C.D. Mafra players
Primeira Liga players
Campeonato de Portugal (league) players